Ansgar Church (Danish: Ansgar Kirke, German: Ansgarkirche) is an evangelical lutheran church in northern Flensburg, Germany. Its congregation is the largest within the Danish Church in Southern Schleswig.

The church is named after Saint Ansgar.

Building 
The creation of a new church in northern Flensburg was first proposed in 1949 by Martin Nørgaard, a pastor originally from Handewitt. Because of difficulty raising funds, the grounds were not purchased by the church until 1962. Construction of the church and its community hall were funded by a donation from A.P. Møller and his wife Chastine Mckinney Møller.

The building was modeled, in part, after Notmark Kirke, a church on the Danish island of Als. It was designed by the architect Kay Fisker, who died before construction began. After Fisker's death, the project was completed by architects Robert Duelund Mortensen and Svend Høgsbroe. Construction began in 1966, and was completed in November 1968.

As of January 5, 2007, the church has been placed under monument protection, and was remodeled in 2008.

Congregation 
The Flensburg North Congregation was established in 1948. The church has approximately 650 members, belonging to around 500 households. It remains the largest congregation within the Danish Church in Southern Schleswig.

Pastors 

 1948–1951 Otto Marius Warncke
 1951–1983 Martin Friedrich Nørgaard
 1952–1959 Christian Overgaard
 1959–1977 Martin Torodd Kontni
 1978–1982 Bjarne Sandal
 1982–1995 Per Østerbye
 1996–2013 Sten Haarløv
 2003–2016 Preben Kortnum Morgensen
 2016–2018 Christina Theresia Frøkjær
 2019–present Merethe Neldebjerg Jørgensen

References 

Churches in Schleswig-Holstein
Church of Denmark churches
Buildings and structures in Flensburg
Churches completed in 1968
Churches in the diocese of Haderslev
20th-century Church of Denmark churches